Sanaye Poshtiban Hormozgan Futsal Club is an Iranian professional futsal club based in Bandar Abbas.

Players

Current squad

Personnel

Current technical staff

Last updated: 13 August 2022

References

External links
 

Futsal clubs in Iran
Sport in Bandar Abbas
2021 establishments in Iran